Stefan Prein (born 27 October 1965 in Wuppertal) is a former Grand Prix motorcycle road racer from Germany. His best year was in 1990 when he won the 125cc Yugoslavian Grand Prix and finished the season in third place in the 125cc world championship, behind Loris Capirossi and Hans Spaan.

References

1965 births
Living people
Sportspeople from Wuppertal
German motorcycle racers
125cc World Championship riders
250cc World Championship riders
80cc World Championship riders